Taufa Fukofuka (born October 22, 1979) is a Tongan rugby league footballer who plays as a five-eighth for the Mu'a Saints in the Tonga National Rugby League competition.

Background
Fukofuka was born in Tonga.

Career
Fukofuka has also appeared on several occasions for the Tonga national rugby league team with his most recent international games coming during the 2006 Federation Shield competition.

He coached Tonga's Rugby League 9's team at the 2015 Pacific Games.

In 2016 he sued Tonga National Rugby League over its failure to audit its accounts, and to require it to hold board elections.

References

1979 births
Living people
Rugby league five-eighths
Tongan rugby league players
Tonga national rugby league team players